Kevin Ojiaku (born 20 April 1989) is a Nigerian and Italian male long jumper. Born in Italy by a Nigerian mother and Italian father.

Biography
Of Nigerian and Italian citizenship, he obtained the IAAF qualification standard, on 27 July 2017 he is selected by Italy national athletics team's technic commissioner, Elio Locatelli, to participate in the 2017 World Championships in Athletics.

His Personal Best of 8.20 m, set in 2017, is the 4th best ever Italian performance and 21h in the 2017 world season list until the beginning of the 2017 World Championships in Athletics.

Personal best
Long jump outdoor: 8.20 m -  Turin, 21 May 2017
Long jump indoor: 7.93 m -  Ancona, 18 February 2017

Achievements

See also
 Italian all-time lists - long jump
 Naturalized athletes of Italy

References

External links

1989 births
Living people
Italian male long jumpers
Athletics competitors of Fiamme Gialle
Italian people of Nigerian descent
Italian sportspeople of African descent
World Athletics Championships athletes for Italy